Otto Boehnke (January 5, 1875 – May 22, 1950) was an American gymnast. He competed in three events at the 1904 Summer Olympics.

References

1875 births
1950 deaths
American male artistic gymnasts
Olympic gymnasts of the United States
Athletes (track and field) at the 1904 Summer Olympics
Gymnasts at the 1904 Summer Olympics
Place of birth missing